The 24th Michigan Infantry Regiment was an infantry regiment that served in the Union Army during the American Civil War. It was part of the Union Iron Brigade.

Service
The 24th Michigan Infantry was organized at Detroit, Michigan and mustered into Federal service on August 15, 1862. It was assigned to the famous Iron Brigade in the Army of the Potomac. The brigade's commander General John Gibbon had requested a new regiment be added to his command because its four original regiments (the 2nd, 6th, and 7th Wisconsin and the 19th Indiana) had been severely depleted by combat action and numbered less than 1000 men total by October 1862. He said that ideally it should be a Western regiment since the others were from that part of the country. Gibbon's request granted, the 24th Michigan joined the brigade and saw its first action at Fredericksburg taking on a nuisance battery of Confederate horse artillery south of the town.

The 24th saw no major action during the Chancellorsville campaign, but at Gettysburg it "Went into action with 496 officers and men. Killed & mortally wounded: 89; Otherwise wounded: 218; Captured: 56; Total casualties: 363. Five color bearers were killed and all the color guard killed or wounded."

Colonel Morrow was wounded while holding the regimental flag. "Just before reaching the fence, Col. Morrow was wounded in the head while bearing the colors. He was stunned by the wound and fell down. He was then helped from the field by Lt. Charles Hutton of Company G."

From thenceforth, the 24th participated in the rest of the Army of the Potomac's campaigns and battles, but was not present at Appomattox because it had been reassigned to a garrison post in Illinois two months earlier.

The regiment was selected as escort at funeral of President Abraham Lincoln.

The regiment was mustered out on June 30, 1865.

Total strength and casualties
The regiment suffered 12 officers and 177 enlisted men who were killed in action or who died of their wounds and 3 officers and 136 enlisted men who died of disease, for a total of 328 fatalities, including John Litogot, the maternal uncle of auto tycoon Henry Ford.

Commanders
 Colonel Henry Andrew Morrow

See also
List of Michigan Civil War Units
Michigan in the American Civil War

References

Bibliography
 Curtis, O. B. History of the Twenty-Fourth Michigan of the Iron Brigade, Known As the Detroit and Wayne County Regiment. Detroit, Mich: Winn & Hammond, 1891.
 Hadden, Robert Lee. "The deadly embrace: the meeting of the Twenty-Fourth Regiment, Michigan Infantry and the Twenty-Sixth Regiment of North Carolina Troops at McPherson's woods, Gettysburg, Pennsylvania, July 1, 1863." Gettysburg magazine. No. 5 (July 1991). Pages 19–33: ill., map.
 Johnson, Chauncey A. Johnsons Military Company and Regimental Record. Company A, Michigan Volunteer Infantry. 24th Regiment. Mustered into the United States Service, August 15, 1862, at Detroit, Michigan. Milwaukee: Chauncey A. Johnson, 1862.
 Kochanowski, Givey, and Givey Kochanowsky. Western Pride: the Iron Brigade from Its Creation to South Mountain. 1999. Term paper written by Kochanowski while a student at the United States Air Force Academy in Colorado providing a history of the Iron Brigade in the Civil War, which was composed of the 2nd, 6th, 7th Wisconsin; 19th Indiana; and 24th Michigan Infantries. Consisting mainly of research from secondary sources, the paper addresses the origin of the Iron Brigade and follows the unit until 1862. Included is a bibliography of sources.
 Lincoln Financial Foundation Collection. The Assassination of Abraham Lincoln. Guards at Lincoln's Tomb. 1925.
 Michigan, and George H. Turner. Record, Twenty-Fourth Michigan Infantry, Civil War, 1861-1865. Kalamazoo: Ihling Bros. & Everard, 1904.
 Milwaukee Public Library. Bibliography of the Iron Brigade: 2nd, 6th and 7th Wisconsin Infantry, 19th Indiana Infantry, 24th Michigan Infantry. 1972.
 Our national liberties--the dearest rights of freemen: Company F, 24th Michigan Vol. Infantry. Bentley Image Bank, Bentley Historical Library, 1865.
 Pardington, John Henry, and Coralou Peel Lassen. Dear Sarah: Letters Home from a Soldier of the Iron Brigade. Bloomington: Indiana University Press, 1999. Collection of over 80 letters written by a Union soldier, Cpl John H Pardington, a member of the 24th Michigan Infantry of the famous Iron Brigade. They are filled with patriotic dedication to the Cause, longing for his wife and baby, details of camp life, and reflections on the battles of Fredericksburg, Chancellorsville and other engagements.
 Smith, Donald L. The Twenty-Fourth Michigan of the Iron Brigade. Harrisburg, Pa: Stackpole Co, 1962.
 Twenty-Fourth Michigan Volunteers, Co. D, Letters, Clothing Distribution List, Clothing Receipts. 1862.
 United States. The Iron Brigader: Newsletter of the 24th Michigan Volunteer Infantry. Lansing, Mich: 24th Michigan Volunteer Infantry Regiment, Inc, 1980.
 Woodworth, George Porter. Abel Peck, Color Bearer, 24th Michigan Infantry Regiment. Milford, Mich: G.P. Woodworth, 1991.

External links
The Civil War Archive
24th Michigan Reenacting Unit  
Flags of the First Day: An Online Exhibit of Iron Brigade and Confederate battle flags from July 1, 1863 :  (Civil War Trust)
((archived copy)) 24th Michigan Infantry Regimental Website

Iron Brigade
Units and formations of the Union Army from Michigan
1865 disestablishments in Michigan
1862 establishments in Michigan
Military units and formations established in 1862
Military units and formations disestablished in 1865